Shen Zemin (Jun 23, 1900 – November 20, 1933) was one of the earliest members of the Communist Party of China (CPC), elected to the 6th Central Committee of the CPC in 1931. He was the younger brother of the prominent novelist Mao Dun (Shen Yanbing) and a member of the 28 Bolsheviks. He was married to Zhang Qinqiu, one of the three female members of the 28 Bolsheviks.

Early life

Shen was born in Wuzhen, Tongxiang, Zhejiang Province. His original name was Shen Deqi or Shen Deji. He also used the pen name Mingxin.

In 1912, he entered Zhejiang No. 3 Middle School in Huzhou. From 1916 to 1919, he attended school in Nanjing with Zhang Wentian, who became another member of the 28 Bolsheviks. He taught at the left-wing Shanghai University, and married his student Zhang Qinqiu in 1924. In late 1925 and early 1926, Shen and Zhang went to the Soviet Union to attend Moscow Sun Yat-sen University. In Moscow, they had a daughter, who they left behind when they returned to China in 1930. In January 1931, at Jinzhai County, Anhui Province, Shen Zemin was made a Communist Party of China Party Secretary for the border region of Hubei, Henan and Anhui Provinces. He died there of a lung ailment two years later.

References
沈泽民，荆楚网，2009-07-31

1900 births
1933 deaths
People from Tongxiang
Moscow Sun Yat-sen University alumni
Heads of the Publicity Department of the Chinese Communist Party
Academic staff of Shanghai University
Chinese Communist Party politicians from Zhejiang
Republic of China politicians from Zhejiang
Educators from Jiaxing